Moquegua may refer to:
Moquegua, a city in southern Peru.
Moquegua District, a district in the Mariscal Nieto Province.
Moquegua Region, a region in southern Peru.